Trechiama is a genus of beetles in the family Carabidae, containing the following species:

 Trechiama abcuma Ueno, 1992
 Trechiama accipitris Ueno, 1983
 Trechiama acco Ueno, 1989
 Trechiama acutidens Ueno, 1986
 Trechiama advena Ueno, 1983
 Trechiama akinobui Ueno, 1986
 Trechiama alatus Ueno, 1979
 Trechiama albidivalis Ueno, 1994
 Trechiama ancorifer Ueno, 1995
 Trechiama angulicollis Jeannel, 1954
 Trechiama angustus Ueno, 1985
 Trechiama apicedentatus Ueno, 1979
 Trechiama applanatus Ueno, 1980
 Trechiama asymmetricus Ueno, 1990
 Trechiama babai Ueno, 1994
 Trechiama balli Ueno, 1986
 Trechiama bandoi Ueno, 1986
 Trechiama borealis Ueno, 1961
 Trechiama brevior Ueno, 1980
 Trechiama canalatus Ueno, 1980
 Trechiama chikaichii Ueno, 1957
 Trechiama chui Ueno, 1990
 Trechiama cognatus Ueno, 1988
 Trechiama cordicollis Ueno, 1974
 Trechiama cornutus Ueno, 1983
 Trechiama crassilobatus Ueno, 1977
 Trechiama crassipes Ueno, 1997
 Trechiama cuancao Ueno, 1991
 Trechiama cuspidatus Ueno, 1985
 Trechiama dispar Ueno, 1988
 Trechiama dissitus Ueno, 1984
 Trechiama duplicatus Ueno, 1986
 Trechiama echigonis Ueno, 1972
 Trechiama etsumianus Ueno, 1988
 Trechiama exilis Ueno, 1983
 Trechiama expectatus Ueno, 1983
 Trechiama fujitai Ueno, 1969
 Trechiama fujiwaraorum Ueno, 1981
 Trechiama gracilor Ueno, 1980
 Trechiama grandicollis Ueno, 1980
 Trechiama habei Ueno, 1954
 Trechiama hamatus Ueno, 1990
 Trechiama hiurai Ueno, 1985
 Trechiama imadatei Ueno & Shibanai, 1954
 Trechiama inermis Ueno, 1980
 Trechiama inexpectatus Ueno, 1980
 Trechiama inflexus Ueno, 1971
 Trechiama insolitus Ueno, 1959
 Trechiama insperatus Ueno, 1970
 Trechiama instabilis Ueno, 1981
 Trechiama insularis Ueno, 1980
 Trechiama intermedius Ueno, 1980
 Trechiama itoi Ueno, 1995
 Trechiama iwasakii Ueno, 1988
 Trechiama janoanus Jeannel, 1939
 Trechiama kawanoi Ueno, 1975
 Trechiama kimurai Ueno, 1959
 Trechiama kosugei Ueno, 1955
 Trechiama kryzhanovskii Lafer, 1989
 Trechiama kurosawai Ueno, 1986
 Trechiama kusakarii Ueno, 1986
 Trechiama kuznetsovi Ueno & Lafer, 1992
 Trechiama lavicola Ueno, 1960
 Trechiama lewisi Jeannel, 1924
 Trechiama longicollis Ueno, 1986
 Trechiama longissimus Ueno, 1991
 Trechiama mahoae Ueno, 1980
 Trechiama mammalis Ueno, 1987
 Trechiama masaakii Ueno & Sone, 1994
 Trechiama masatakai Ueno, 1983
 Trechiama medicirex Ueno, 1989
 Trechiama meridianus Ueno, 1994
 Trechiama minutus Ueno, 1971
 Trechiama morii Ashida, 1999
 Trechiama moritai Ueno, 1985
 Trechiama murakamii Ueno, 1984
 Trechiama nagahinis Ueno, 1976
 Trechiama nakaoi Ueno, 1972
 Trechiama namigatai Ueno, 1989
 Trechiama nivalis Ueno, 1986
 Trechiama nonensis Ueno, 1995
 Trechiama notoi Ueno, 1981
 Trechiama obliquus Ueno, 1985
 Trechiama occidentalis Ueno, 1987
 Trechiama ohkawai Ueno, 1993
 Trechiama ohkurai Ueno, 1996
 Trechiama ohruii Ueno, 1972
 Trechiama ohshimai Ueno, 1951
 Trechiama ondai Ueno, 1993
 Trechiama oni Ueno, 195
 Trechiama oniceps Ueno, 1989
 Trechiama onocoro Ueno, 1983
 Trechiama oopterus Ueno, 1995
 Trechiama oreas Bates, 1883
 Trechiama ovoideus Ueno, 1970
 Trechiama pacatus Ueno, 1994
 Trechiama pallidior Ueno, 1981
 Trechiama parvus Ueno, 1980
 Trechiama perissus Ueno, 1983
 Trechiama planipennis Ueno, 1995
 Trechiama pluto Ueno, 1958
 Trechiama reductoculatus Ueno, 1992
 Trechiama rotundipennis Ueno, 1980
 Trechiama ruri Ashida, 1998
 Trechiama sasajii Ueno, 1980
 Trechiama satoui Ueno, 1975
 Trechiama setosus Ueno, 1990
 Trechiama shuten Ueno, 1978
 Trechiama sichotanus Lafer, 1989
 Trechiama sigma Ueno, 1980
 Trechiama silicicola Ueno, 1981
 Trechiama sinuatus Ueno, 1995
 Trechiama sonei Ueno, 1982
 Trechiama sonuta Ueno, 1992
 Trechiama spinosus Ueno, 1980
 Trechiama spinulifer Ueno, 1985
 Trechiama subparallelus Ueno, 1980
 Trechiama suzukaensis Ueno, 1980
 Trechiama suzukii Ueno, 1989
 Trechiama tamaensis Yoshida & Nomura, 1960
 Trechiama tangonis Ueno, 1985
 Trechiama tanzawanus Ueno & Sane, 1994
 Trechiama tener Ueno, 1989
 Trechiama tenuiformis Ueno, 1980
 Trechiama tenuis Ueno, 1983
 Trechiama teradai Ueno, 1971
 Trechiama terraenovae Ueno, 1988
 Trechiama tokui Ueno, 1989
 Trechiama triops Ueno, 1994
 Trechiama tsurugaensis Ueno, 1980
 Trechiama umbraticus Ueno, 1983
 Trechiama uncatus Ueno, 1986
 Trechiama varians Ueno, 1981
 Trechiama watanabei Ueno, 1971
 Trechiama yokoyamai Ueno, 1958
 Trechiama yoro Ashida, 1998
 Trechiama yoshiakii Ueno, 1978
 Trechiama yoshidai Ueno, 1983
 Trechiama yoshikoae Ueno, 1994
 Trechiama yukikoae Ueno, 1985

References

Trechinae